Eyre Chatterton (22 July 1863 – 8 December 1950) was an eminent Anglican author who served as a bishop in India from 1903 to 1926. He was also an amateur tennis player.

Life
He was born in Monkstown, County Cork on 22 July 1863 and educated at Haileybury and Imperial Service College and Trinity College, Dublin. He was ordained  by Bishop Lightfoot in 1887, and began his career with a curacy at Holy Trinity, Stockton-on-Tees. He was head of the Dublin University Mission to Chhöta Nagpur from 1891 to 1900 when he returned briefly to England to be curate of St Mary Magdalene, Richmond, Surrey. In 1902 it was announced he would become the inaugural bishop of Nagpur, a post he held for 23 years. He died on 8 December 1950.

Chatterton competed on the amateur tennis tour during the 1880s.

He was elected a Fellow of the Royal Geographical Society (FRGS) in December 1901.

In 1926 he was appointed an assistant bishop in the Diocese of Canterbury.

Works

With the Troops in Mesopotamia, 1916
 with Stephen Hislop and Sir Richard Carnac Temple

Notes

External links

1863 births
People from Monkstown, County Cork
Alumni of Trinity College Dublin
Fellows of the Royal Geographical Society
20th-century Anglican bishops in India
Anglican bishops of Nagpur
1950 deaths
Irish male tennis players